The 1997 S.League was the 2nd season of the S.League, the top professional football league in Singapore. The format of the league was changed, a single season of home and away matches replacing the split seasons and a playoff model of the 1996 season. 

The 1997 S.League championship was won by Singapore Armed Forces FC.

Teams

Police Football Club underwent a rebranding, being renamed as Home United while NFL side Jurong Town Football Club, who renamed themselves Jurong FC, joined the competition taking the number of participating clubs to 9. As a result of the construction of the new Jurong East Stadium being incomplete, Jurong FC used Bukit Gombak Stadium as their home ground for the 1997 S.League season.

Foreign players

Final table

Top scorers

External links
 S.League 1997

Singapore Premier League seasons
1
Sing
Sing